The Battle of Daugavpils, or Battle of Dyneburg, was the final battle during the Polish-Soviet War of 1919. A joint Polish and Latvian force, operating under Polish Staff orders known as "Operation Winter", attacked the Red Army garrison in Dunaburg, or Daugavpils, from 3 to 5 January 1920.

From the Polish perspective, the battle was part of the Polish-Soviet War. In Latvia, it is considered to be part of Latvian War of Independence.

Background
The Polish commander of the 1st Legions Infantry Division and 3rd Legions Infantry Division, General (later Marshal) Edward Rydz-Śmigły had been occupying the left bank of the Dvina since August.  The Latvian Foreign Minister had met with Pilsudski in Vilnius (then Wilno in Polish) in October 1919 and asked for assistance at Dunaburg. The Poles wanted to prevent the Soviet XVth and XVIth armies from consolidating at that juncture and readily agreed. A final agreement was reached on 30 December 1919, and a military alliance was signed between the governments of Poland and Latvia.

Battle
General Rydz-Śmigły was given the command over a small Operational Group composed of his 1st Legions Infantry Division, the 3rd Legions Infantry Division and several minor Latvian auxiliary forces. In addition, the force included Renault FT tanks of the 2nd company, 1st Tank Regiment, which was commanded by the French Captain Jean Dufour.

The battle for the city and its surroundings took place under harsh weather conditions. The Polish 3rd Legionary Division stormed the Daugavpils fortress, and the 1st Infantry Division attacked from the north. The Red Army garrison retreated to the west, where it surrendered to the Latvians. On 5 January 1920, Dunaburg was turned over to the Latvian Republic.

Aftermath
Interwar relations between Poland and Latvia were mostly good because of the battle although Latvia refused to join Poland in its continued struggle against Soviet Russia. Other problems that precluded the Polish and Latvian governments from expanding their relationship were opposition from Lithuania, which was hostile towards Poland after the Polish-Lithuanian War, and a dispute about six Latvian rural municipalities and the city of Grīva that had many Poles south of the Daugava River.

Several forms of alliance were proposed by Poland, such as Latvia joining the Międzymorze, a federation led by Poland. However, Latvia chose instead to join the Baltic Entente.

See also 
 List of battles of the Polish–Soviet War

References

1919 in Poland
1920 in Poland
Daugavpils 1919
Daugavpils
Latvian Socialist Soviet Republic
1919 in Latvia
1920 in Latvia
History of Daugavpils
January 1920 events
Independence of Latvia
Daugavpils
Daugavpils